The Dörbet (Dörwyd; , Dörvöd, lit. "the Fours"; ; also known in English as the Derbet) is the second largest subgroup of Mongol people in modern Mongolia and was formerly one of the major tribes of the Four Oirat confederation in the 15th-18th centuries. In early times, the Dörbets and the Öold were ruled by collateral branches of the Choros lineage. The Dörbets are distributed among the western provinces of Mongolia, Kalmykia and in a small portion in Heilongjiang, China. In modern-day Mongolia, the Dörbets are centered in Uvs Province.

History
A
Dörben clan existed within the Mongol tribe in the 12th–13th centuries, but the Dörböds appear as an Oirat tribe only in the latter half of the 16th century. What their relation, if any, is to the Dörben clan of the 12th–13th centuries is unclear. The name probably means  "döröv"; "four" (Middle Mongolian: dörbe).

In the 17th century, the leader of Dörbets was Dalai Taishi (d.1637). In order to unite the Oirats, Dalai Taishi used the method of marriage of convenience; Dalai Taishi and Khoshut leader Güshi Khan married the Torghut leader Kho Orluk sisters. During the Dalai Taishi period (circa 1625), the Oirat tribes lived in harmony.

In 1616, Dalai Taishi established diplomatic relations with the Tsardom of Russia. The next year Dalai Taishi's son Solom Tseren joined the Kalmyks on the Volga with 4,000 households. In 1699 a body of the Dörbets joined the Don Cossacks, eventually becoming the Buzava Kalmyks. Trapped west of the Volga, the Do'rbets could not join the 1771 flight of the Torguds, and hence dominated the remaining Kalmyks. In the early 19th century, they had split into the Lesser Dörbets, living in northern Kalmykia and the Greater Dörbets, living around Lake Manych-Gudilo.

Meanwhile, the Dörbets in the Oirat homeland remained a major sub-group of the Dzungars. In 1753 during a worsening civil war amongst the Oirat, three Dörbet leaders submitted to the Qing dynasty. They were resettled first in Bayankhongor Province, and then in Uvs Province in 1759. They formed into 16 banners of the Sain Zayaatu Leagues. The Dörbets nobility's 15,000 subjects included Bayids and a small number of Khotongs.

From the 1880s, the Khalkha influenced Dörbet socio-economic trends. The Kalmyk Dambijantsan headed the anti-communist disturbances; and separatist feeling remained strong until the 1930s.

Number
The Dörbets in Mongolia numbered 55,200 in 1989. In 2000 - 66,706.

Notable people 
 Yumjaagiin Tsedenbal - former Prime Minister of People's Republic of Mongolia and  general secretary of Mongolian People's Revolutionary Party
Begziin Givaan - the Hero of the People's Republic of Mongolia
 Nasanjargaliin Darjaa - Former minister of Food and Agriculture
 Puntsagiin Ulaankhuu - former vice minister of Agriculture
 Zodoviin Omboo - Mongolian notable physicist

References

 Хойт С.К. Белые пятна в этногенезе дэрбэт // Молодежь и наука: третье тысячелетие. Материалы II республиканской научно-практической конференции (Элиста, 30 ноября 2005 г.). Элиста: АОр «НПП «Джангар», 2006. стр. 104-122. - in Russian
 Ovtchinnikova O., Druzina E., Galushkin S., Spitsyn V., Ovtchinnikov I. An Azian-specific 9-bp deletion in region V of mitochondrial DNA is found in Europe // Medizinische Genetic. 9 Tahrestagung der Gesellschaft für Humangenetik, 1997, p. 85.
 Galushkin S.K., Spitsyn V.A., Crawford M.H. Genetic Structure of Mongolic-speaking Kalmyks // Human Biology, December 2001, v.73, no. 6, pp. 823–834.
 Хойт С.К. Генетическая структура европейских ойратских групп по локусам ABO, RH, HP, TF, GC, ACP1, PGM1, ESD, GLO1, SOD-A // Проблемы этнической истории и культуры тюрко-монгольских народов. Сборник научных трудов. Вып. I. Элиста: КИГИ РАН, 2009. с. 146-183. - in Russian
 [hamagmongol.narod.ru/library/khoyt_2008_r.htm Хойт С.К. Антропологические характеристики калмыков по данным исследователей XVIII-XIX вв. // Вестник Прикаспия: археология, история, этнография. № 1. Элиста: Изд-во КГУ, 2008. с. 220-243.]
 [hamagmongol.narod.ru/library/khoyt_2012_r.htm Хойт С.К. Калмыки в работах антропологов первой половины XX вв. // Вестник Прикаспия: археология, история, этнография. № 3, 2012. с. 215-245.]
 Boris Malyarchuk, Miroslava Derenko, Galina Denisova, Sanj Khoyt, Marcin Wozniak, Tomasz Grzybowski and Ilya Zakharov Y-chromosome diversity in the Kalmyks at theethnical and tribal levels // Journal of Human Genetics (2013), 1–8.

External links 
 ELAR archive of Durvud Oirat language documentation materials

Mongol peoples
Ethnic groups in Mongolia
Kalmykia
Kalmyk people
Oirats
Nirun Mongols